is a Japanese voice actress from Chiba Prefecture, Japan.

Biography 
Takamoto auditioned for roles since junior high school, becoming a voice actress without attending training schools or vocational schools. She thought she would go to a training school after graduating from college, but made her debut while at school instead. During school, she was in the Valley Club.

In 2005, she won the Grand Prix at the 1st Sigma Seven Public Audition, and in April of the following year, debuted as Momoko Ichihara, the main character in the anime Love Get Chu: Miracle Seiyū Hakusho. In the event "Negima! Maho Ryogakuen Middle School 3-A 1st semester opening ceremony" held on April 23, it was announced that she would play the role of Chao Lingshen in the anime Negima! Magister Negi Magi. She is best known for playing the role of Winry Rockbell in 2009's Fullmetal Alchemist: Brotherhood.

In 2020, Takamoto announced she will marry a man who is outside of the industry. The wedding will be in February 2021.

Filmography

Anime 
2006
 Love Get Chu (Momoko Ichihara)
 Negima!? (Chao Lingshen)
2007
 Big Windup! (Tomoka Fukami)
 Fantastic Detective Labyrinth (Hinako Mizuse)
2008
 Nogizaka Haruka no Himitsu (Maria Yukinohara)
 Jigoku Shoujo Mitsugane (Yuna Serizawa)
2009
 Fullmetal Alchemist: Brotherhood (Winry Rockbell)
 Sasameki Koto (Ushio Kazama)
 Sora no Manimani (Akina Kawamura)
 White Album (Misaki Sawakura)
2010
 Big Windup! ~Natsu no Taikai-hen~ (Tomoka Fukami)
 Hetalia: Axis Powers (Seychelles)
 Jewelpet Twinkle☆ (Alma Jinnai)
2011
 B-Daman Crossfire (Natsumi Inaba)
 A Dark Rabbit Has Seven Lives (Himea Saito)
 Deadman Wonderland (Mimi)
 Sket Dance (Mimori Unyū)
2012
 Jewelpet Kira☆Deco! (Saury)
 Oniichan dakedo Ai sae Areba Kankeinai yo ne! (Kaoruko Jinno)
 Saki Achiga-hen episode of Side-A (Hina Yamatani, Keiko Yagihara, Yoshiko Yasakouchi)
2013
 Cross Fight B-Daman eS (Natsumi Inaba)
 Unbreakable Machine-Doll (Charlotte Belew)
2014
 Dragon Collection (Ice Valkyrie)
 Jinsei (Tomoko Uchimura)
 Rokujyoma no Shinryakusha!? (Harumi Sakuraba)
 Saki: The Nationals (Hina Yamatani)
2015
 Cardfight!! Vanguard G (Hinako Miyamae)
2016
 And you thought there is never a girl online? (Ako's mother)
2017
 Konohana Kitan (Hiyori)
2021
 Hetalia: World Stars (Seychelles)

OVA 
 A Dark Rabbit Has Seven Lives (Himea Saito)
 Magi: Adventure of Sinbad (Sinbad (young))
 Negima! Magister Negi Magi (Chao Lingshen)
 Otome wa Boku ni Koishiteru: Futari no Elder (Kayleigh Glanzelius)

Theatrical animation 
 Fullmetal Alchemist: The Sacred Star of Milos (Winry Rockbell)
 Negima! Anime Final (Chao Lingshen)

References

External links 
 

1985 births
Living people
Japanese video game actresses
Japanese voice actresses
Sigma Seven voice actors
Voice actresses from Chiba Prefecture
21st-century Japanese actresses
21st-century Japanese women singers
21st-century Japanese singers